James Patterson (March 25, 1794 – May 2, 1867) was an American Democratic Party politician from New Jersey, who served as director of the Monmouth County, New Jersey Board of Chosen Freeholders and the New Jersey Legislative Council.

Biography
A son of Jehu Patterson, James Patterson was born in Middletown Township, New Jersey on March 25, 1794.

Elected as a Democrat to the Legislative Council in 1841, Patterson served through 1844; that year he was elected Vice President of Council, a position held a decade earlier by his father.

In 1845, Patterson was elected to the Board of Chosen Freeholders representing Middletown Township. At the May 14, 1851 annual reorganization, he was chosen as Director of the Monmouth County, New Jersey Board of Chosen Freeholders, and served as Director through May 9, 1855 when he left the board.

Patterson returned to the state legislature in 1860, when he was elected to the General Assembly; he was reelected in 1861.

James Patterson died on May 2, 1867.

Five sons would serve in public office, namely, Jehu, James and C. Ewing, who each would serve as county clerk; John, sheriff; and Samuel, freeholder.

See also
List of Monmouth County Freeholder Directors

Notes and references

1867 deaths
Members of the New Jersey Legislative Council
County commissioners in New Jersey
Democratic Party members of the New Jersey General Assembly
People from Middletown Township, New Jersey
Politicians from Monmouth County, New Jersey
1794 births
19th-century American politicians